Robert James McCloskey (November 25, 1922 – November 28, 1996) was an American diplomat, ombudsman, and relief services executive.

Born in Philadelphia, Pennsylvania, the son of Thomas McCloskey and Anna Wallace, he was spokesperson for the United States Department of State from 1964 to 1973 but after a short stint (June 20, 1973, to January 14, 1974) as United States Ambassador to Cyprus, he was asked to return to his old job as spokesperson. From February 21, 1975, to September 10, 1976, he served as Assistant Secretary of State for Congressional Relations. He later served as United States Ambassador to the Netherlands and to Greece. His government career was followed by a stint as ombudsman at the Washington Post, then as senior vice president of International Catholic Relief Services.

Family
He married Anne Taylor Phelan on July 8, 1961. They had two daughters, Lisa and Andre. He died of leukemia in 1996 in Chevy Chase, Maryland at age 74.

References

1922 births
1996 deaths
United States Department of State officials
Ambassadors of the United States to Cyprus
Ambassadors of the United States to Greece
Ambassadors of the United States to the Netherlands
People from Philadelphia
United States Department of State spokespeople
United States Foreign Service personnel
Deaths from leukemia
Deaths from cancer in Maryland